This is an incomplete list of Filipino full-length films, both mainstream and independently produced, released in theaters and cinemas in 2018.

Box office

Films

January–March

April–June

July–September

October–December

Awards

Local
The following first list shows the Best Picture winners at the four major film awards: FAMAS Awards, Gawad Urian Awards, Luna Awards and Star Awards; and at the three major film festivals: Metro Manila Film Festival, Cinemalaya and Cinema One Originals. The second list shows films with the most awards won from the four major film awards and a breakdown of their total number of awards per award ceremony.

References

External links
 

Lists of 2018 films by country or language